The Golden Horn ( or Haliç; , Chrysókeras) is a major urban waterway and the primary inlet of the Bosphorus in Istanbul, Turkey. As a natural estuary that connects with the Bosphorus Strait at the point where the strait meets the Sea of Marmara, the waters of the Golden Horn help define the northern boundary of the peninsula constituting "Old Istanbul" (ancient Byzantium and Constantinople), the tip of which is the promontory of Sarayburnu, or Seraglio Point. This estuarial inlet geographically separates the historic center of Istanbul from the rest of the city, and forms a horn-shaped, sheltered harbor that in the course of history has protected Greek, Roman, Byzantine, Ottoman and other maritime trade ships for thousands of years.

Throughout its history, the Golden Horn has witnessed many tumultuous historical incidents, and has been depicted in numerous works of art.

An hourly Golden Horn ferry service connects Üsküdar and Karaköy with most of the suburbs along the estuary. In 2021 the T5 tramline opened on the western shore of the Golden Horn. It runs from the Alibeyköy bus station as far as Cibali, beside the Atatürk Bridge, and an extension already in the making will continue it to Eminönü where it will intersect with the T1 tramline and several ferry services.

Description
The Golden Horn is the estuary of the Alibey and Kağıthane Rivers. While the reference to a "horn" is understood to refer to the inlet's aerial silhouette, the significance of the designation "golden" remains more obscure, with historians believing it to refer to either the riches brought into the city through the bustling historic harbor located along its shores, or to romantic artistic interpretations of the rich yellow light blazing upon the estuary's waters as the sun sets over the city. Its Greek and English names mean the same, while its Turkish name, Haliç, simply means "estuary", and derives from the Arabic word khaleej, meaning "gulf".
The following districts line the western shore of the Golden Horn from south to north: Cibali, Fener, Balat, Ayvansaray, Eyüp, Silahtarağa, Sakarya and Alibeyköy. The following districts line the eastern shore of the Golden Horn from south to north: Kasımpaşa, Hasköy, and Sütlüce.

At present, the Golden Horn is spanned by four bridges. Moving from upstream to downstream (i.e. northwest to southeast), these are as follows:

 Haliç Bridge, completed in 1974, which connects the neighborhoods of Sütlüce and Defterdar
 Atatürk Bridge, aka Unkapanı Bridge, completed in 1940, which connects Kasımpaşa and Unkapanı
 Golden Horn Metro Bridge, a pedestrianized railway crossing, completed in 2014, that extends subway line M2 of the Istanbul Metro across the Golden Horn 
 Galata Bridge (its fifth incarnation, completed in 1994), between Karaköy and Eminönü
The Eski Galata Bridge (literally, Old Galata Bridge), now-defunct, used to connect the downstream neighborhoods of Karaköy and Eminönü, but was disassembled and relocated upstream between Ayvansaray and Keçeci Piri following extensive damage in 1992 caused by a fire originating in the kitchen of one of the restaurants located on the bridge's lower level. Originally dating back to 1912, the now-retired structure is no longer used for vehicular or pedestrian traffic, but functions as a seasonal outdoor exhibit and event space attached to Haliç Park.

History 

Archaeological records show a significant urban presence on and around the Golden Horn dating back to at least the 7th century BC, with smaller settlements going as far back as 6700 BC as confirmed by recent discoveries of ancient ports, storage facilities, and fleets of trade ships unearthed during construction work for the Yenikapı subway station and the Marmaray tunnel project.

Indeed, the deep natural harbor provided by the Golden Horn has always been a major economic attraction and strategic military advantage for inhabitants of the area. Emperor Constantine I established Nova Roma (later Constantinople) on top of the existing city of Byzantium to capitalize on the same benefits, as did the founders of the previous settlement and its modern successor, Istanbul.

The Eastern Roman Empire had its naval headquarters there, and walls were built along the shoreline to protect the city of Constantinople from naval attacks. At the entrance to the Horn on the northern side, a large chain was pulled across from Constantinople to the old Tower of Galata to prevent unwanted ships from entering. Known among the Byzantines as the Megàlos Pyrgos (meaning "Great Tower" in Greek), this tower was largely destroyed by the Latin Crusaders during the Fourth Crusade in 1204. In 1348, the Genoese built a new tower nearby which they called Christea Turris (Tower of Christ), now called Galata Tower.

There were three notable times when the chain across the Horn was either broken or circumvented. In the 10th century the Kievan Rus' dragged their longships out of the Bosphorus, around Galata, and relaunched them in the Horn; the Byzantines defeated them with Greek fire. In 1204, during the Fourth Crusade, Venetian ships were able to break the chain with a ram. In 1453, Ottoman Sultan Mehmed II, having failed in his attempt to break the chain with brute force, instead used the same tactic as the Rus'; towing his ships across Galata over greased logs and into the estuary.

After the Ottoman conquest of Constantinople in 1453, Mehmed II resettled ethnic Greeks along the Horn in the Phanar (today's Fener). Balat continued to be inhabited by Jews, as during the Byzantine age, though many Jews decided to leave following the takeover of the city. This area was repopulated when Bayezid II invited the Jews who were expelled from Spain to resettle in Balat.

In 1502, Leonardo da Vinci produced a drawing of a single-span  bridge over the Golden Horn as part of a civil engineering project for Sultan Bayezid II. Leonardo's drawings and notes regarding this bridge are currently displayed at the Museo della Scienza e della Tecnologia in Milan, Italy. While the original design was never executed, the vision of Leonardo's Golden Horn Bridge was resurrected in 2001, when a small footbridge based on Leonardo's design was constructed near Ås in Norway by Vebjørn Sand.

Until the 1980s, the Horn was polluted with industrial waste from the factories, warehouses, and shipyards along its shores. It has since been cleaned, and the local fish, wildlife, and flora have been largely restored. The clean-up happened in two main phases under Mayor Bedrettin Dalan in the 1980s and under Mayor Recep Tayyip Erdoğan in the 1990s.

Nowadays, the Golden Horn is settled on both sides, and there are parks along each shore. The Istanbul Chamber of Commerce is also located along the shore, as are several Muslim, Jewish and Christian cemeteries. Other institutions along the Horn's banks include museums, congress and cultural halls, supporting facilities of the Turkish Navy, and campuses of various universities.

Today, the Horn's history and natural environment make it a popular tourist attraction in Istanbul, visited by 10 million international vacationers annually.

Tersane Istanbul 
Sometimes claimed as the oldest shipyard in the world, the Haliç Shipyard (Haliç Tersanesi in Turkish) was founded by Sultan Mehmed II in 1455. It remained in operation both for shipbuilding and repairs into the 1960s but then fell into disrepair. The site is now being redeveloped as the giant Tersane Istanbul project which will bring hotels, museums, art galleries, shops and restaurants to a very rundown area. In February 2019 President Erdoğan announced the start of the project and in October 2021 it started to open when the Contemporary Istanbul art fair was staged there. It is intended that the Sadberk Hanım Museum will relocate to Tersane Istanbul from Sarıyer as part of the project.

In popular culture
The Golden Horn is featured in many works of literature dealing with classical themes. For example, G. K. Chesterton's poem Lepanto contains the memorable couplet "From evening isles fantastical rings faint the Spanish gun, / And the Lord upon the Golden Horn is laughing in the sun."

Image gallery

See also
 Atatürk Bridge
 Galata Bridge
 Galata Tower
 Metro Bridge
 Haliç Bridge

References

External links 

 Golden Horn
 Golden Horn University
 The Social Community of Golden Horn 
 The Leonardo Bridge Project
 Ferries in Istanbul

 
Constantinople
Estuaries of Turkey
Ancient Greek geography
Fatih
Landforms of Istanbul Province